The Scarab Mk. II was a sports racing car, designed, developed and built by American manufacturer Scarab, between 1958 and 1959.

References

Sports racing cars
1950s cars
Cars of the United States